Mark Fenn Lewis (born 13 October 1987) is an English former first-class cricketer.

Lewis was born at Coventry and was educated at Princethorpe College, before going up to Oxford Brookes University. While studying at Oxford Brookes, he made a single appearance in first-class cricket for Oxford UCCE against Glamorgan at Oxford in 2009. Batting once in the match, he scored an unbeaten 74 in the Oxford UCCE first innings, which was the highest score in the innings. His brother, Tom, played Twenty20 cricket for Warwickshire.

Notes and references

External links

1987 births
Living people
Cricketers from Coventry
People educated at Princethorpe College
Alumni of Oxford Brookes University
English cricketers
Oxford MCCU cricketers